Alfred Kirke Ffrench VC (25 February 1835 – 29 December 1872) was a recipient of the Victoria Cross, the highest and most prestigious award for gallantry in the face of the enemy that can be awarded to British and Commonwealth forces.

Ffrench was twenty-two years old, and a lieutenant in the 53rd Regiment of Foot (later The King's Shropshire Light Infantry) of the British Army during the Indian Mutiny, when he performed the deed on 16 November 1857 at Lucknow, India for which he was awarded the V.C.:

He later reached the rank of captain. Ffrench took ill whilst serving in Bermuda and died in London. The officers of his regiment wore black arm bands upon the notice of his death, following which he was buried at Brompton Cemetery.  A memorial tablet to him was also placed in St Chad's Church, Shrewsbury.

His Victoria Cross is displayed at The King's Shropshire Light Infantry Museum in Shrewsbury Castle, Shropshire, England.

References

External links

Location of grave and VC medal (Brompton Cemetery)
 

1835 births
1872 deaths
King's Shropshire Light Infantry officers
British recipients of the Victoria Cross
Indian Rebellion of 1857 recipients of the Victoria Cross
Burials at Brompton Cemetery
People from Meerut
19th-century British people
British Army recipients of the Victoria Cross